Cloud Column is a monumental stainless steel 2006 sculpture by Anish Kapoor, installed outside Glassell School of Art in Houston, Texas, in 2018.

The sculpture was completed in England and transported to its current location, The Brown Foundation, Inc. Plaza, on March 27, 2018.

Some locals have given the artwork the nickname "El Frijol". In Spanish, "frijol" means "bean", which is the English nickname for Kapoor's Chicago sculpture Cloud Gate (2006).

See also

 List of public art in Houston

References

External links
Cloud Column at AnishKapoor.com
Cloud Column at Museum of Fine Arts, Houston

2006 sculptures
2018 establishments in Texas
Outdoor sculptures in Houston
Sculptures by Anish Kapoor
Stainless steel sculptures in the United States
Steel sculptures in Texas
Mirrors in art